Frano  is a Croatian masculine given name.

Notable people with the name include:
 Frano Bakarić, Croatian sprinter
 Frano Botica, New Zealand-Croatian rugby coach and player
 Frano Getaldić-Gundulić, Ragusan writer and politician
 Frano Gundulić, Ragusan nobleman
 Ivan Frano Jukić, Bosnian cleric and writer
 Frano Kršinić, Croatian sculptor
 Frano Kršinić (biologist), Croatian marine biologist
 Frano Lasić, Croatian actor and singer
 Frano Menegello Dinčić, Yugoslav artist
 Frano Mlinar, Croatian football player
 Frano Radman, Dalmatian cleric and writer
 Frano Supilo, Croatian politician and journalist
 Frano Vićan, Croatian water polo player
 Frano Vodopivec, Croatian cinematographer
 Frano Zubić, Bosnian cleric

See also
 Franjo
 Frane
 Fran (given name)

Croatian masculine given names